The Foundation for Government Accountability (FGA) is an American public policy think tank based in Naples, Florida. The nonprofit organization primarily focuses on welfare, health care, election integrity, and workforce policy reform at both the state and federal levels. FGA conducts policy research and its experts recommend free-market policies intended to promote work, reduce dependency, and increase opportunity.

The organization was founded in 2011 by Tarren Bragdon, who now serves as their CEO and president. FGA's "emphasis on policy messaging and marketing...has differentiated the group from traditional think tanks." Since 2015, FGA has achieved 283 state policy reforms in 40 states and 20 federal policy reforms impacting 868 state policies, ultimately meaning that 9.5 million individuals were impacted by FGA-led policy changes.

History
FGA was founded in 2011 by Tarren Bragdon, a former Maine legislator and past CEO of the Maine Heritage Policy Center. According to the organization, FGA was established to focus on policy reform in Florida, but expanded to a multi-state strategy of implementing reforms that reduce government dependency nationwide.

FGA is a 501(c)(3) nonprofit organization under the U.S. Internal Revenue Code. FGA states that it is primarily funded by private individuals, with the remaining funding coming from foundations and businesses. In 2011, the organization's income was $212,000 and in 2012 its funding grew to $731,000.The organization's revenue grew to $13.152,294 in 2021.

FGA has a full-time staff of 43 regular employees, and more than 40 contractors located across the United States. As of 2021, it operates on a budget of $12.5 million.

Policy issues

Welfare reform
FGA's welfare policy reforms are aimed at reducing government dependency through the power of work.

Food Stamps 
FGA supports work requirements tied to food stamps. The organization advocated for welfare changes in several different states before beginning to advocate for changes at a federal level in 2017. FGA supports legislation that would require able-bodied individuals between the ages of 18 and 60 to work or attend training programs for 20 hours each week in order to receive benefits.

The organization advocated for welfare changes in several different states before beginning to advocate for changes at the federal level in 2017. FGA supports legislation that would require able-bodied individuals between the ages of 18 and 60 to work or attend training programs for 20 hours each week in order to receive benefits. According to FGA, "Work registrants are able-bodied adults under the age of 60 who do not have young children or meet some other exemption. This includes able-bodied adults without dependents (ABAWDs), a subgroup within the work registrant population that are between the ages of 18 and 49 and who have no dependent children. This also includes parents of school-aged children and able-bodied childless adults between 50 and 59 years old."

The organization's "Restore the Working Class" project was named a finalist for the Atlas Network's Templeton Award. The project focused on encouraging work and focusing aid to the truly needy by strengthening eligibility and reducing waste, fraud, and abuse.

Medicaid 
Blocking Medicaid expansion attempts has been a longtime project of FGA, as it sees Medicaid spending under the Affordable Care Act, or Obamacare, as unsustainable, threatening both state budgets and the services provided to traditional Medicaid patients. One study developed a measure of "right-wing network strength" based on activity by organizations including the FGA, and found via linear regression that this measure was a statistically significant factor in whether or not a state expanded the program.

A 2021 piece by the editorial board of the Wall Street Journal note FGA's position on Medicaid eligibility and improper payments: "It is no coincidence," FGA says that the two states with the highest publicly available improper payment rates have expanded Medicaid under Obamacare."

Stop the Scam 
Stop the Scam was an FGA campaign that began in 2014 encouraging states to partner with third-party vendors to verify correct filing for public programs like Medicare and Medicaid. As of 2022, FGA has enveloped Stop the Scam policy reforms into a broader "program integrity" suite of policy recommendations.

Child Support Cooperation 
Because of FGA's work, states including Nebraska, Arkansas, and South Dakota enacted a reform to help single-parent families collect past-due or unpaid child support requiring parents to cooperate with child support collection efforts before receiving subsidies.

Tracking Studies 
Since 2014, FGA has partnered with nearly a dozen state agencies to retrieve data and publish findings on conservative policy changes including food stamp work requirements and Medicaid work requirements, among others. By studying and tracking the impact of different reforms, FGA aims to describe what welfare policies have a demonstrable effect on the incomes and independence of people on welfare. FGA conducted what was described as the first and most comprehensive study of the impact of work requirements on able-bodied adults on food stamps in Kansas and Maine. The study concluded that incomes more than doubled within a year for those who transitioned out of the program, in contrast to other studies that found far more modest or even negative gains after comparable program-imposed time limits or means-testing.

In 2018, FGA built a multimedia campaign around the release of their "Waivers Gone Wild" reports, which raised national awareness of these loopholes and emphasized the need to rein in waiver abuse so that the food stamp program can adequately serve the truly needy and empower able-bodied adults to move from welfare to work. The campaign employed email, social media, op-eds, and outreach to educate lawmakers, journalists, and the public about this issue. As a result, the Trump administration proposed a rule to curb abuse of the work requirement loopholes. This campaign was awarded "2019 Best Issue Campaign" by the State Policy Network.

Health Care

Right to Shop 
Right to Shop is an FGA proposal for a mechanism incentivizing patients to shop for health care services based on price and perceived value. It is based on existing programs, including a Massachusetts price transparency component and New Hampshire's Smart Shopper program.

Trump Administration 
FGA remained an influential voice on domestic health care policy issues during President Donald Trump's term.

Off-Market Options 
FGA has advocated for various health coverage options that are not part of the individual market or exchange. These include association health plans, short-term plans, and Farm Bureau plans. FGA has highlighted the lower costs of these alternative options compared to conventional health insurance plans on the market.

Election Integrity 
In 2021, FGA took on the issue of election and ballot integrity and is working with partners across the country to restore voter confidence. FGA has bee the leading national think tank advocating against the private funding of elections, coined "Zuckerbucks." In addition to Zuckerbucks, FGA has published election-related research on holding election officials accountable, improving accurate and fast ballot counting, secure voting by mail, and secure voter registration. FGA has produced a series of videos surrounding election integrity and restoring voter confidence, including with state and federal policymakers such as Florida Gov. Ron DeSantis and numerous Secretaries of State.

Workforce 
FGA's workforce solutions aim to remove government red tape surrounding the workplace and promote workplace alternatives such as apprenticeships, licensed occupations, and entrepreneurship. The group also promotes solutions to prepare the next generation for careers that don't require a four-year degree or incur high student loan debt.

Unemployment 
FGA has proposed several reforms related to unemployment insurance policy:

 Index unemployment insurance benefit durations to prevailing economic conditions. 
 Make it easier for businesses to acquire experience rating
 Requiring unemployment fraud and overpayment recovery
 Requiring employers to report refusals to work
 Maintaining unemployment insurance program integrity through the National Integrity Data Hub

FGA's Vice President of Policy and Research, Jonathan Ingram, explains in an opinion for the Wall Street Journal, FGA's unemployment indexing policy reform stating, "When the economy is strong and the unemployment rate is low, benefits end sooner. When the economy is struggling and unemployment is high, benefits last longer. This approach spurs work and saves money in good times, while more effectively supporting laid-off workers in the toughest times."

Special Projects

Center for Excellence in Polling 
In 2021, the Foundation for Government Accountability launched the Center for Excellence in Polling (CEP), a new project that conducts quality market research and proactive messaging analysis to inform policymakers and the public of voters' opinions, attitudes, and concerns on critical public policy issues.

Uncover Obamacare 
Uncover ObamaCare was an FGA initiative which ran from 2013 to 2015 and resulted in 24 states initially saying no to the Affordable Care Act's Medicaid expansion option. Their work kept 9.5 million Americans from becoming dependent on government and saved taxpayers almost $500 billion over the following decade. Since then, FGA has strongly advocated against Medicaid expansion in the remaining non-expansion states.

COVID-19 
FGA's polling, communications, research, and outreach played an instrumental role in stopping a full renewal of the $600 weekly federal unemployment insurance bonus passed in March 2020 through the CARES Act. According to senior staff from the Senate Steering Committee, FGA's polling - which showed that extending the $600 weekly bonus was both bad policy and bad politics - was the only non-media polling senators had on the issue, and "changed the debate" on the Senate floor. Combined with FGA's efforts to stop state bailouts, this change saved taxpayers $806 billion in 2020 alone.

Affiliations and Coalitions 
The Foundation for Government Accountability is a member of the State Policy Network, a network of free-market oriented think tanks in the United States. FGA is also a partner organization with the Atlas Network, a group that provides training, networking, and grants for libertarian and free-market groups around the world.

Funding 
FGA operates as a 501(c)(3) tax-exempt nonprofit. In 2021, Charity Navigator gave the organization a 100 (out of 100) for finance, accountability, leadership, and adaptability. According to the organization, 75 percent of contributions in 2020 came from individuals, with 24 percent coming from foundations and 1 percent coming from businesses.

References

External links
 
 Profile at Charity Navigator
 Organizational Profile – National Center for Charitable Statistics (Urban Institute)

Political and economic think tanks in the United States
Naples, Florida
Think tanks established in 2011